Katosi is a town in the Mukono District of the Central Region of Uganda. The town is an urban center under Mukono District Administration.

Location

The geographical coordinates of Katosi are 0°09'10.0"N, 32°48'05.0"E (Latitude:0.152778; Longitude:32.801389).

Overview
Traditionally, Katosi was a fishing village and a landing site for water craft transporting people and merchandise between Koome Island in Mukono District and the Buvuma Islands in neighboring Buvuma District and the mainland. During the last decade of the 20th century and in the first decade of the 21st century, Katosi became a major fishing center, with the majority of the catch exported to Europe and the Middle East. As the fishing village has increased in economic importance, the human population has increased as well.

Katosi has a high population of AIDS orphans and widows.

Recent developments
In 2011, the National Water and Sewerage Corporation (NWSC), the government parastatal responsible for water supply and sanitation, announced plans to build a water treatment plant in Katosi, capable of supplying  of purified water daily. The new water plant will cost approximately US$306 million and will supply mainly the rapidly growing towns of Mukono and Kira Town.

Population
, the estimated population of Katosi was 16,442.

Points of interest
The following points of interest lie within or near Katosi:
Offices of Katosi Intercomunity Development Alliance (KIDA), an NGO
 Offices of Katosi Town Council
 Offices of Katosi Women Development Trust (KWDT), an NGO
 Offices of  Katosi Women Fishing & Development Association (KWFDA), another NGO
 The site where National Water and Sewerage Corporation built the Katosi Water Treatment Plant.
 Katosi Landing Site
 Katosi Fish Market
 Katosi Central Market

See also
Uganda National Roads Authority

References

External links
 Why You Should Be Interested In Mukono-Katosi Road Scandal

Populated places in Central Region, Uganda
Cities in the Great Rift Valley
Mukono District